Jinyi Cinemas is a cinema operator in China, headquartered in the Leedon Sunshine Hotel (礼顿阳光大厦 Lǐdùn Yángguāng Dàshà) in Zhujiang New Town, Tianhe District, Guangzhou. As of 2004 the shares are with Guangzhou Performance Company and Guangzhou Jiayu Real Estate Development Company. Some locations are named Jinyi International Cinemas. (金逸国际影城 Jīnyì Guójì Yǐngchéng).

In 2004 the company cooperated with Warner Brothers to build cinemas in South China.

In 2014 the company failed to receive an IPO.

References

External links
 Jinyi Cinemas 

Cinema chains in China
Companies based in Guangzhou
Tianhe District